Giuseppe "José" Foralosso (March 15, 1938 – August 22, 2012) was the Roman Catholic bishop of the Roman Catholic Diocese of Marabá, Brazil.

Ordained to the priesthood in 1966, Foralosso was named bishop in 1991. He resigned in 2012.

Notes

1938 births
2012 deaths
21st-century Roman Catholic bishops in Brazil
Italian emigrants to Brazil
20th-century Roman Catholic bishops in Brazil
Roman Catholic bishops of Marabá